This is a list of colleges and universities in Mississippi. This list also includes other educational institutions providing higher education, meaning tertiary, Postgraduate, and, in some cases, post-secondary education.

State institutions

Four-year institutions
 Alcorn State University - Lorman 
 Delta State University - Cleveland
 Jackson State University - Jackson
 Mississippi State University - Starkville and Mississippi State
 Mississippi State University, Biloxi - Biloxi
 Mississippi State University, Meridian - Meridian
 Mississippi State University, Vicksburg - Vicksburg
 Mississippi University for Women - Columbus
 Mississippi Valley State University, Mississippi Valley State
 University of Mississippi - Oxford and University
 University of Mississippi, Booneville - Booneville
 University of Mississippi, Grenada - Grenada
 University of Mississippi, Southaven - Southaven
 University of Mississippi, Tupelo - Tupelo
 University of Mississippi Medical Center - Jackson
 University of Southern Mississippi - Hattiesburg
 University of Southern Mississippi - Gulf Park - Long Beach

Two-year institutions
 Blue Cliff College - Gulfport
 Coahoma Community College - Clarksdale
 Copiah–Lincoln Community College - Wesson
 Copiah–Lincoln Community College, Magee - Magee
 Copiah–Lincoln Community College, Natchez - Natchez
 East Central Community College - Decatur
 East Mississippi Community College - Scooba
 East Mississippi Community College, Columbus Air Force Base - Columbus
 East Mississippi Community College, Golden Triangle - Mayhew
 East Mississippi Community College, Lion Hills Center - Columbus
 East Mississippi Community College, Macon - Macon
 East Mississippi Community College, Naval Air Station Meridian - Meridian 
 East Mississippi Community College, West Point-Clay County Center - Clay County
 Hinds Community College - Raymond
 Hinds Community College Academic/Technical Center - Jackson
 Hinds Community College Aviation Maintenance/Commercial Aviation - Raymond
 Hinds Community College Nursing/Allied Health Center - Jackson
 Hinds Community College, Rankin - Pearl
 Hinds Community College, Utica - Utica 
 Hinds Community College, Vicksburg-Warren - Vicksburg
 Holmes Community College - Goodman, Grenada, and Ridgeland
 Holmes Community College, Kosciusko - Attala Educational Center / Workforce Development - Kosciusko
 Holmes Community College, Yazoo Center - Yazoo City
 Itawamba Community College - Fulton, Belden, and Tupelo
 Jones County Junior College - Ellisville
 Madison University - Gulfport
 Meridian Community College - Meridian
 Mississippi Delta Community College - Moorhead
 MDCC Charles W. Capps Jr. Technology Center - Indianola
 Drew Center - Drew
 Greenville Higher Education Center - Greenville (Has classes from various institutions.)
 Greenwood Center - Greenwood
 Mississippi Gulf Coast Community College - Perkinston
 Applied Technology and Development Center - Gulfport
 Mississippi Gulf Coast Community College, George County - Lucedale
 Mississippi Gulf Coast Community College, Jackson County - Gautier
 Mississippi Gulf Coast Community College, Jefferson Davis - Gulfport
 Keesler Center - Biloxi
 West Harrison County Center - Long Beach
 Northeast Mississippi Community College - Booneville 
 Northeast Mississippi Community College, Corinth - Corinth
 Northeast Mississippi Community College, New Albany - New Albany
 Northwest Mississippi Community College - Senatobia 
 DeSoto Center - Southaven and Olive Branch
 Lafayette-Yalobusha Technical Center - Oxford
 Pearl River Community College - Poplarville
 Southwest Mississippi Community College - Summit

Private institutions

Private liberal arts colleges
 Blue Mountain College - Blue Mountain 
 Millsaps College - Jackson
 Rust College - Holly Springs
 Tougaloo College - Tougaloo

Private colleges and universities
 Belhaven University - Jackson and Madison
 Mississippi College - Clinton
 Mississippi College School of Law - Jackson
 Reformed Theological Seminary - Jackson
 Southeastern Baptist College - Laurel
 Wesley Biblical Seminary - Jackson
 William Carey University - Hattiesburg and Biloxi

Former institutions
 Saints Academy - Lexington

See also

 List of college athletic programs in Mississippi
 Higher education in the United States
 Lists of American institutions of higher education
 List of recognized higher education accreditation organizations
 Lists of universities and colleges
 Lists of universities and colleges by country

References

External links
Department of Education listing of accredited institutions in Mississippi

 
Mississippi
Colleges and Universities